William Luther Pierce III (September 11, 1933 – July 23, 2002) was an American neo-Nazi, white supremacist, and far-right political activist. For more than 30 years, he was one of the highest-profile individuals of the white nationalist movement. A physicist by profession, he was author of the novels The Turner Diaries and Hunter under the pseudonym Andrew Macdonald. The former has inspired multiple hate crimes including the 1995 Oklahoma City bombing. Pierce founded the white nationalist National Alliance, an organization which he led for almost 30 years.

Born in Atlanta to a Presbyterian family of Scotch-Irish and English descent, Pierce was a descendant of Thomas H. Watts, the Governor of Alabama and the Attorney General of the Confederate States of America during the American Civil War. Pierce graduated from high school in 1952 and he went on to receive a bachelor's degree in physics from Rice University in 1955 as well as a doctorate from University of Colorado at Boulder in 1962. He became an assistant professor of physics at the Oregon State University in that year. In 1965, he left his tenure at Oregon State University and became a senior researcher for the aerospace manufacturer Pratt & Whitney in Connecticut. In 1966, Pierce moved to the Washington, D.C. area and became an associate of George Lincoln Rockwell, founder of the American Nazi Party, who was assassinated in 1967. Pierce became co-leader of the National Youth Alliance, which split in 1974, with Pierce founding the National Alliance.

Pierce's novel The Turner Diaries (1978) depicts a violent revolution in the United States, followed by a world war and the extermination of non-white races. Another novel by Pierce, Hunter (1989) portrays the actions of a lone-wolf white supremacist assassin. In 1985, Pierce relocated the headquarters of the National Alliance to Hillsboro, West Virginia where he founded the Cosmotheist Community Church to receive tax exemption for his organization. Pierce spent the rest of his life in West Virginia hosting a weekly show, American Dissident Voices, publishing the internal newsletter National Alliance Bulletin (formerly titled Action), and overseeing his publications, National Vanguard magazine (originally titled Attack!), Free Speech and Resistance, as well as books which were published by his publishing firm National Vanguard Books, Inc. and the white power music label Resistance Records.

At the time of Pierce's death in 2002, the National Alliance was bringing in more than $1 million a year, with more than 1,500 members and a paid national staff of 17 full-time officials. After Pierce's death, it entered a period of internal conflict and decline.

Life and career

Early life and education 

William Luther Pierce III was born in Atlanta, Georgia. The son of William Luther Pierce Jr. and Marguerite Farrell, his Presbyterian family was of English and Scotch-Irish descent. Pierce's younger brother, Flournoy Sanders, an engineer, was born in 1936, and later assisted Pierce in his political activities. He died in 2020 from complications from COVID-19. His father was born in Christiansburg, Virginia in 1892. His mother was born in Richland, Georgia in 1910, with her family being part of the aristocracy of the Old South, descendants of Thomas H. Watts, the Governor of Alabama and Attorney General of the Confederate States of America. After the American Civil War, the family lived a working-class existence. Pierce's father once served as a government representative on ocean-going cargo ships and sent reports back to Washington, D.C.; he later became manager of an insurance agency but was killed in a car accident in 1943. After the elder Pierce's death, the family moved to Montgomery, Alabama, and after that to Dallas, Texas.

Pierce performed well in school. His last two years in high school were spent at the Allen Military Academy in Bryan, Texas. As a teenager his hobbies and interests were model rockets, chemistry, radios, electronics, and reading science fiction.

After finishing military school in 1951, Pierce worked briefly in an oil field as a roustabout. He was injured when a four-inch (10 cm) pipe fell on his hand, and he spent the rest of that summer working as a shoe salesman. Pierce earned a scholarship to attend Rice University in Houston. He graduated from Rice in 1955 with a bachelor's degree in physics. He worked at the Los Alamos National Laboratory before attending graduate school, initially at Caltech during 1955–56. At the University of Colorado in Boulder, Colorado, he earned a master's degree and a doctorate in 1962. He taught physics as an assistant professor at Oregon State University from 1962 to 1965.

Early political activities 
His tenure as assistant professor at Oregon State University coincided with the rise of the Civil Rights Movement and later the counterculture. The former, along with the protests against the Vietnam War, he regarded as being led by Jews. In 1965 to finance his political ambitions, Pierce left his tenure at Oregon State University and relocated to North Haven, Connecticut, to work as a senior researcher at the Advanced Materials Research and Development Laboratory of aerospace manufacturer Pratt & Whitney.

After a brief membership in the anti-communist John Birch Society in 1962, he resigned because the Society was uninvolved in race issues. After he moved to Washington, D.C. he became an associate of George Lincoln Rockwell, founder of the American Nazi Party. During this time he was the editor of the party's quarterly ideological journal, National Socialist World. When Rockwell was murdered in 1967, Pierce became one of the leading members of the National Socialist White People's Party, the successor to the ANP.

In 1968, Pierce left the NSWPP and joined Youth for Wallace, an organization supporting the bid for the presidency of George Wallace, the former Governor of Alabama. In 1970, along with Willis Carto he reconfigured Youth for Wallace into the National Youth Alliance. However, a complex dispute between the two men had begun by the late 1960s. By 1971, Pierce and Carto were openly feuding with the latter accusing the former of the theft of the Liberty Lobby mailing list. These issues caused the NYA to split, and by 1974 Pierce's wing became known as the National Alliance. Among the founding members of the board of the National Alliance was a University of Illinois professor of classics, Revilo P. Oliver, who was to have major impact of Pierce's life both as an adviser and friend.

National Alliance 

The National Alliance was organized in 1974. Pierce intended the organization to be a political vanguard that would ultimately bring about a white nationalist overthrow of the United States Federal Government. Pierce spent the rest of his life living in West Virginia. From this location, he hosted a weekly radio show, American Dissident Voices from 1991, the internal newsletter National Alliance Bulletin (formerly called Action), and oversaw his publications, National Vanguard magazine (originally titled Attack!), Free Speech and Resistance, as well as books published by his publishing firm National Vanguard Books, Inc. (many of which promoted Holocaust denial) and the "white power" record company, Resistance Records, which Pierce supported from its inception around 1993 and purchased outright in 1999. On the topic of the Holocaust, he claimed the number of deaths had been exaggerated, and that many of the details had been fabricated.

In 1978, claiming the National Alliance was an educational organization, Pierce applied for and was denied, tax exemption by the Internal Revenue Service. Pierce appealed, but an appellate court upheld the IRS decision. Around the same time, he was interviewed by Herbert Poinsett on Race and Reason, a public-access television cable TV talk show co-hosted by former Klansman Tom Metzger.

An anti-Zionist, he attempted during the Yom Kippur War to force McDonnell Douglas into canceling military contracts that sent armaments to Israel by buying shares of the company's stock and putting forward the motion at the national shareholder's meeting. The company rejected the motion and continued supplying Israel with weapons. Some of Pierce's later speeches on American Dissident Voices concerning the Arab–Israeli conflict were reprinted in Muslim publications and on websites, including that of the Lebanese Shia Islamist group Hezbollah.

In 1985, Pierce moved his operations from Arlington, Virginia, to a  location in Mill Point, West Virginia, where he paid for with $95,000 in cash. At this location, he founded the Cosmotheist Community Church. In 1986, the church applied again, this time successfully, for federal, state, and local tax exemptions. It lost its state tax exemption for all but 60 acres, which had to be exclusively used for religious purposes. The other   parcel was used for both the National Alliance headquarters and the National Vanguard Books business and warehouse, and was denied state tax exemption.

In 1990, the documentary series Different Drummer produced a portrait of Pierce, which was aired on PBS. He later participated twice on a public-access television cable TV live talk show hosted by Ron Doggett, Race and Reality and aired from Richmond, Virginia.

Pierce was frequently described as a neo-Nazi, although he personally rejected this label. When confronted with the issue by Mike Wallace on 60 minutes, Pierce described the term as a slander:

I admire many things that Hitler wrote, many of the programs and policies that he instituted in Germany, but we do not blindly copy anyone else's policies or programs. We've formulated our own program in view of the situation that we face here in America today.

In 1998, Pierce was a contributor to a documentary produced by the Discovery Channel about white nationalism in the United States. As the leader of the National Alliance, Pierce established contacts with other nationalist groups in Europe, including the National Democratic Party of Germany, the British National Party (BNP), and the Greek Golden Dawn party. He also had ties to BNP leader John Tyndall Pierce's other recruiting efforts included a 51-minute informational video titled America is a Changing Country, and forming an anti-globalization group – the Anti-Globalization Action Network – to protest at the G8 summit in Canada in June 2002.

Pierce's last public speech was made in Cleveland, Ohio on April 28, 2002. On July 23, 2002, he died of renal failure, three weeks after being diagnosed with cancer that had spread through his body. 

At the time, the National Alliance was bringing in more than $1  million a year, with more than 1,500 members, a paid national staff of 17 full-time officials, and was better known than at any time in its history, after which it entered a period of internal conflict and decline.

Novels

The Turner Diaries 

Pierce gained attention following the 1995 Oklahoma City bombing by Timothy McVeigh, who was said to be inspired by The Turner Diaries (1978), the novel written by Pierce under the pseudonym Andrew Macdonald. The book is a graphically violent depiction of a future race war in the United States, which includes a detailed description of the "Day of the Rope" mass hangings of many "race traitors" (especially Jews and those in interracial marriages or relationships) in the public streets of Los Angeles, followed by the systematic ethnic cleansing of the city, and eventually the entire world. This violence and killing is called "terrible yet absolutely necessary". The story is told through the perspective of Earl Turner, an active member of the white revolutionary underground resistance, called The Organization, led by the secret inner circle known as The Order (a reorganized SS).

The part most relevant to the McVeigh case is in an early chapter, when the book's main character is placed in charge of bombing the FBI headquarters. Some have pointed out similarities between the bombing in the book and the actual bombing in Oklahoma City that damaged the Alfred P. Murrah Federal Building and killed 168 people on April 19, 1995. When McVeigh was arrested later that day, pages from the book were found in his car, with several phrases highlighted, including "But the real value of all of our attacks today lies in the psychological impact, not in the immediate casualties" and "We can still find them and kill them."

The Turner Diaries also inspired a group of white revolutionary nationalists in the early 1980s who called themselves the Silent Brotherhood, or sometimes simply The Order. The Order was an offshoot of the Aryan Nations. They were tired of being merely "armchair revolutionaries". The Order was connected to numerous crimes, including counterfeiting and bank robbery, and supposedly gave money to the Alliance. The Order's leader, Robert Jay Mathews, died in a stand-off with police and federal agents on Whidbey Island, Washington when police fired flares into his hideout, igniting a fire. Other Order members including David Lane were captured and sent to federal prisons. In 1996 Pierce sold the rights to The Turner Diaries to the Jewish publisher Lyle Stuart.

On May 19, 1996, Pierce was interviewed on 60 Minutes, during which Pierce was asked by Mike Wallace if he approved of the Oklahoma City bombing, and he replied "No. No, I don't. I've said that over and over again, that I do not approve of the Oklahoma City bombing because the United States is not yet in a revolutionary situation." A year earlier in a telephone interview with The Washington Post, he was quoted as saying: "the Oklahoma City bombing didn't make sense politically. Terrorism only makes sense if it can be sustained over a period of time. One day there will be real, organized terrorism done according to plan, aimed at bringing down the government."

Hunter 

In 1989, again under the Andrew Macdonald pen name, Pierce published another novel, Hunter, which tells the story of a man named Oscar Yeager, a veteran of the Vietnam War who begins by killing multiple interracial couples. He then assassinates liberal journalists, politicians and bureaucrats in the D.C. area. In interviews, Pierce called Hunter more realistic, and described his rationale for writing it as taking the reader through "an educational process".

Religion 
In the 1970s, Pierce created the religious philosophy of cosmotheism, based on a mixture of German romanticism, the Darwinian concept of natural selection, and Pierce's interpretation of George Bernard Shaw's play, Man and Superman. The Anti-Defamation League and the Southern Poverty Law Center both assert that Pierce created cosmotheism in order to acquire tax-exempt status for the National Alliance after he had failed to do so earlier, and the SPLC refers to it as a "bogus religion".

Personal life 

Pierce was married five times. His first marriage was to Patricia Jones, a mathematician he met while he was attending the California Institute of Technology. They were married in 1957 and had twin sons, Kelvin and Erik, born in 1960. Kelvin was an aerospace engineer, while Erik is a computer scientist. According to Kelvin Pierce, his father had been emotionally and physically abusive. In 2020, Kelvin coauthored Sins of My Father: Growing Up with America's Most Dangerous White Supremacist, which chronicled his experiences with his father.

William Luther Pierce's marriage with Patricia Jones ended in divorce in 1982. The same year, Pierce married Elizabeth Prostel whom he met in the National Alliance office in Arlington. The marriage ended in 1985 and Pierce moved his headquarters to southern West Virginia. Preferring immigrant women from Eastern Europe, in 1986 Pierce married a Hungarian woman named Olga Skerlecz. She is a relative of Iván Skerlecz, Governor of Croatia-Slavonia; the marriage lasted until 1990. Olga moved to California after their divorce. Pierce then married another Hungarian woman named Zsuzsannah in early 1991. They met through an advertisement that Pierce placed in a Hungarian women's magazine aimed at arranging international marriages. Leaving him in the summer of 1996, Zsuzsannah moved to Florida. His last marriage in 1997, which lasted until his death, was to another Hungarian woman, Irena, toward whom he was reportedly "sharp and condescending" and who had been miserable living with him.

Death 
Pierce died of kidney failure at his Hillsboro, West Virginia base on July 23, 2002.

Works 
As William Luther Price:
 "Who We Are" (2012)
 "Cosmotheism: Divine Aryan Consciousness from Man to Super-Man" (2013) (with Fred Streed & Kevin Alfred Strom)

As Andrew Macdonald:
 The Turner Diaries (1978)
 Hunter (1984)

In 1993, Pierce wrote the script of the comic book New World Order Comix #1: The Saga of White Will!! which was illustrated by Daniel "Rip" Roush and colored by William White Williams.

References 
Notes

Bibliography
 
 
 

Further reading

External links 

 National Vanguard, a publication of the National Alliance
 Pierce's entry  at History Commons
 William L. Pierce's FBI files, obtained under the FOIA and hosted at the Internet Archive:
 FBI headquarters file Part 1
 FBI headquarters file Part 2
 FBI headquarters file Part 3
 Washington field office files

1933 births
2002 deaths
American conspiracy theorists
American eugenicists
American Holocaust deniers
American Nazi Party members
American neo-Nazis
20th-century American male writers
American people of English descent
American people of Scotch-Irish descent
20th-century American physicists
Anti-Masonry
Deaths from cancer in West Virginia
Former Presbyterians
Former atheists and agnostics
John Birch Society members
Male critics of feminism
Oregon State University faculty
Pantheists
People from Atlanta
People from Hillsboro, West Virginia
People from Pocahontas County, West Virginia
Rice University alumni
University of Colorado Boulder alumni
20th-century pseudonymous writers
White separatists